Kazarnoye is a rural locality (a village) in Kadnikov, Sokolsky District, Vologda Oblast, Russia. The population was 6 as of 2002.

Geography 
Kazarnoye is located 45 km east of Sokol (the district's administrative centre) by road. Bratskoye is the nearest rural locality.

References 

Rural localities in Sokolsky District, Vologda Oblast